Priority is the 27th studio album by the Christian music group The Imperials, released in late 1980 on DaySpring Records. It is the second album that the group has collaborated with well-known musician/producer Michael Omartian, their first being their previous album One More Song for You (1979). In 1982, the Imperials won their fourth and, to date, final Grammy Award for Best Gospel Performance, Contemporary or Inspirational at the 24th Grammy Awards and at the 13th GMA Dove Awards, they were named Group of the Year and Priority was named Pop/Contemporary Album of the Year. Lead singer Russ Taff won his second Dove Award for Male Vocalist of the Year, winning back-to-back. Prior to the award ceremonies, Taff had left the group in 1981 to begin his solo career and started work on his debut album Walls of Glass (1983) before being replaced by Paul Smith as the new lead singer. Priority gave the Imperials their second number-one album on Billboard magazine's Top Inspirational Albums chart.

Track listing
All music and lyrics by Michael and Stormie Omartian, except where noted.

Personnel 

The Imperials
 Russ Taff – lead vocals
 Jim Murray – tenor, vocals
 David Will – baritone, vocals
 Armond Morales – bass, vocals

Musicians
 Michael Omartian – keyboards 
 Marty Walsh – guitars 
 Abraham Laboriel – bass 
 Paul Leim – drums 
 Alex Acuña – congas
 Kim Hutchcroft – saxophones, sax solos
 Jackie Kelso – saxophones 
 Dick Hyde – trombone 
 Lew McCreary – trombone 
 Chuck Findley – trumpet 
 Steve Madaio – trumpet 
 Assa Drori – concertmaster 
 Myrna Matthews – additional backing vocals 
 Marti McCall – additional backing vocals 
 Stormie Omartian – additional backing vocals 

Production
 Michael Omartian – producer, arrangements 
 John Guess – engineer, remixing 
 Ken Perry – mastering at Capitol Mastering (Hollywood, California)
 Yvonne Garcia – production coordinator 
 Bob Anderson – layout, photography

Charts

Radio singles

Accolades
Grammy Awards

GMA Dove Awards
1982 Group of the Year

References

1980 albums
The Imperials albums
Word Records albums
Albums produced by Michael Omartian